"Me at the zoo" is the first video uploaded to YouTube, on April 23, 2005, 8:31:52 p.m. PDT, or April 24, 2005, at 03:31:52 UTC. The 19-second video features YouTube's co-founder Jawed Karim, who was 25 years old at the time, in front of two elephants at the San Diego Zoo in California, noting their long trunks. Using Karim's camera, it was recorded by his high school friend, Yakov Lapitsky, a University of Delaware PhD student at the time, who was in San Diego to deliver his research to the American Chemical Society.

Reception
The Los Angeles Times explained in 2009 that "as the first video uploaded to YouTube, it played a pivotal role in fundamentally altering how people consumed media and helped usher in a golden era of the 60-second video". The Observer described its production quality as poor. Digital Trends called it a "nondescript affair" and "tongue-in-cheek" video that set "the tone for what was to come" on YouTube.

Legacy
Greg Jarboe describes the video's representation of an "ordinary moment" to be "extraordinary" for its time, demonstrating YouTube co-founder Jawed Karim's vision of what YouTube would become. According to Jarboe, "Me at the zoo" showed that YouTube was not simply about trying to "capture special moments on video" but rather trying to empower YouTube users "to become the broadcasters of tomorrow". This paved the way for YouTube to become the world's most popular online video-sharing community. Aaron Duplantier said that the ordinary "everydayness" and "dry aesthetics" of "Me at the zoo" set the tone for the type of original amateur content that would become typical of YouTube, especially among YouTubers and vloggers. In addition to being the first video on YouTube, it has been described as the first YouTube vlog clip.

Business Insider ranked it the most important YouTube video of all time, stating: "It is representative of YouTube—it doesn't need to be this fancy production; it can be approachable. The first YouTube video is something anyone could create on their own." The New York Observer also ranked it the most important video in YouTube history, stating "the thing is practically a historical artifact". BuzzFeed News listed it among the 20 most important online videos of all time.

On multiple occasions, Karim has used the video's description feed to criticize YouTube's business actions. In November 2013, in response to Google requiring YouTube users to use Google+ accounts to comment on videos, he updated the description to say "I can't comment here anymore, since i don't want a Google+ account". In November 2021, the video's description was changed in response to YouTube's decision to remove video dislikes from public view, reading: "When every YouTuber agrees that removing dislikes is a stupid idea, it probably is. Try again, YouTube ". A few days later, the description was changed again to a more detailed condemnation of YouTube's decision.

See also
List of most-viewed YouTube videos

References

External links

2005 in Internet culture
2005 short films
2005 YouTube videos
Articles containing video clips
2000s English-language films
Films about elephants
Films set in San Diego
Films set in zoos
History of YouTube
Internet memes introduced in 2005
San Diego Zoo
Viral videos